Carex disperma is a species of sedge known by the common names softleaf sedge or two-seed sedge. It is native to much of the northern Northern Hemisphere, from Alaska to Greenland, most of Canada and the contiguous United States, and across Eurasia.

Description
Carex disperma grows in many types of wet habitat, such as swamps, meadows, and moist forest understory. This sedge produces thin, nodding stems up to 60 centimeters long from a network of branching rhizomes. The leaves are flat, green, and very narrow, less than 2 millimeters wide. The small open inflorescence is made up of 2 to 4 small rounded spikes.

References

External links
Jepson Manual Treatment - Carex disperma
USDA Plants Profile
Flora of North America
Carex disperma - Photo gallery

disperma
Flora of Europe
Flora of Korea
Flora of North America
Flora of temperate Asia
Plants described in 1820